Cowboy Justice is the seventh album by bassist Ben Allison. It was released by Palmetto Records.

Reception

The New York Times review commented: "Together the band makes a virtue of simplicity, often pushing toward a pulsating, layered sense of groove." The Penguin Guide to Jazz suggested that guitarist Cardenas had not fully blended in to Allison's band, and described the album as a "fine balance of violence, tawdriness, refined beauty and raw satire".

Track list
All compositions by Ben Allison.

"Tricky Dick"
"Talking Heads"
"Hey Man"
"Emergency"
"Midnight Cowboy"
"Tricky Rides Again"
"Weazy"
"Ruby's Roundabout"
"Blabbermouth"

Personnel
 Ben Allison – bass, guitar
 Steve Cardenas – guitar
 Ron Horton – trumpet, flugelhorn
 Jeff Ballard – drums

References

External links
 benallison.com - Cowboy Justice

2006 albums
Ben Allison albums
Palmetto Records albums